Iqbal Bahu (4 September 1944 – 24 March 2012) was a Pakistani sufi and a folk singer. He is considered one of the greatest folk singers in subcontinent.

Early life and career
Iqbal Bahu was born as Muhammad Iqbal in Gurdaspur, British India in 1944. His family migrated to Pakistan after partition in 1947, and settled in Lahore. Iqbal started his career as a banker. He worked for National Bank of Pakistan from 1971 to 1997, but his singing in Sufi music brought him fame and recognition. Bahu started his singing career in 1964 from Radio Pakistan, Lahore. He was introduced to Radio by Muhammad Azam Khan, former chief controller Radio Pakistan. His involvement in the mysticism of the 17th century well-known Sufi saint Sultan Bahu made him add Bahu to his name. He held a special command in Punjabi language poetry of Sufi tradition and included works of other saints such as Fariduddin Ganjshakar in his repertoire. In the beginning, he sang mainly for Radio Pakistan and then later for Pakistan Television. Playwright Amjad Islam Amjad also created a small role for Bahu in drama serial Waris. He mastered the Sufi tradition of well-known saint Sultan Bahu. He sang many Sufiana songs for the Radio Pakistan and the Pakistan Television. 

He also gave concert performances around the globe in his later life including at BBC Bush House, London in 1992. He was awarded Tamgha-i-Imtiaz (Medal of Excellence) Award by the Government of Pakistan in 2008.

Death
Bahu died on 24 March 2012 due to a heart attack in Lahore at age 68 and was laid to rest at Miani Sahib Graveyard, Lahore next day. Among the survivors were his wife, 3 daughters and 2 sons.

Awards
 Tamgha-i-Imtiaz (Medal of Excellence) Award in 2008 by the Government of Pakistan
 Sultan Bahu Award
 PTV Award
 Graduate Award
 Baba Fareed Award
 Hazrat Sultan Bahoo Award
 International Sufi Festival Award 
 Red Crescent Award
 Kalam-e-Bahoo Award
 Herf-O-Awaz Award

References

External links
 A delightful confluence of cultures – The Chandigarh Tribune (newspaper)

1944 births
2012 deaths
Pakistani Sunni Muslims
Pakistani male singers
People from Gurdaspur
Performers of Sufi music
Pakistani folk singers
Punjabi-language singers
Punjabi people
Recipients of Tamgha-e-Imtiaz
Singers from Lahore
Pakistani performers of Islamic music
PTV Award winners